The 4th Anti-Aircraft Division (4th AA Division) was an air defence formation of Britain's Territorial Army, created in the period of tension before the outbreak of the Second World War. It defended North West England during the Blitz.

Origin
Increasing concern during the 1930s about the threat of air attack led to large numbers of units of the part-time Territorial Army (TA) being converted to anti-aircraft (AA) gun and searchlight roles in the Royal Artillery (RA) and Royal Engineers (RE), and higher formations became necessary to control them. One such formation was the 4th AA Division, raised on 1 September 1938 in Western Command, with its headquarters at Chester. The first General Officer Commanding (GOC) was Maj-Gen Hugh Martin.

The AA Divisions were unlike field formations: they were established to organise training and later exercise operational command in the static conditions of home defence, but relied entirely on the Home Forces commands for logistic support, supplies, and heavy repairs. They came under the operational control of RAF Fighter Command.

The 4th AA Division was initially responsible for the industrial areas of the North West and West Midlands of England and North and South Wales. At first it consisted of two brigades: the existing Liverpool-based 33rd (Western) AA Brigade transferred from the 2nd AA Division and the newly formed 34th (South Midland) AA Brigade based at Coventry. Shortly afterwards, 44th AA Brigade was formed at Manchester. The division came under the control of Anti-Aircraft Command when that was formed in April 1939.

Mobilisation
The deterioration in international relations led to a partial mobilisation in June 1939, and a proportion of TA AA units manned their war stations under a rotation system known as 'Couverture'. Full mobilisation of AA Command came in August 1939, ahead of the declaration of war on 3 September 1939. Two new brigades, 53rd (Light) AA Brigade composed of Light AA (LAA) units, and 54th, composed of searchlight units, were in the process of formation in the 4th AA Division as mobilisation proceeded.

Order of Battle
On mobilisation in August 1939, the division was composed as follows:
 33rd (Western) Anti-Aircraft Brigade – HQ at Liverpool
 70th (3rd West Lancashire) AA Regiment, RA – Heavy Anti-Aircraft (HAA) unit formed in 1937 at Aigburth, Liverpool, by conversion of 89th (3rd West Lancashire) Field Brigade, RA
 81st AA Regiment, RA – HAA unit formed in 1936 at Stalybridge and Stockport by conversion of the 60th (Cheshire & Shropshire) Medium Brigade, RA
 93rd AA Regiment, RA – new HAA unit raised in 1939 in Birkenhead and Chester
 38th (The King's Regiment) AA Battalion, RE – Searchlight unit formed in 1936 at Liverpool by conversion of the 6th (Rifles) Battalion King's Regiment (Liverpool)
 4th Battalion, The Loyal Regiment (North Lancashire) (62nd Searchlight Regiment) – infantry battalion based at Preston converted into a searchlight unit in 1938
 33rd AA Brigade Company Royal Army Service Corps
 34th (South Midland) Anti-Aircraft Brigade – HQ at Coventry
 69th (Royal Warwickshire Regiment) AA Regiment, RA – HAA unit formed at Birmingham  in 1936 by conversion of the 6th Battalion, Royal Warwickshire Regiment 
 73rd AA Regiment, RA – HAA unit raised at Wolverhampton and West Bromwich in 1938 from batteries drawn from the 62nd (North Midland) Field and 51st (Midland) Medium Brigades, RA
 95th (Birmingham) AA Regiment, RA – newly raised in April 1939, with one battery from the 73rd AA Regiment
 34th AA Brigade Company, RASC
 44th Anti-Aircraft Brigade – HQ at Manchester
 65th (The Manchester Regiment) AA Regiment, RA – HAA unit formed at Hulme in 1936 by conversion of the 6th/7th Battalion. Manchester Regiment
 39th (The Lancashire Fusiliers) AA Battalion, RE – Searchlight unit formed at Salford in 1936 by conversion of the 7th Battalion Lancashire Fusiliers
 71st (East Lancashire) Searchlight Regiment, RA – new searchlight unit raised in Manchester in  1938
 44th AA Brigade Company, RASC
 53rd Light Anti-Aircraft Brigade – Forming at Chester
 15th (Isle of Man) LAA Regiment, RA – at Douglas, Isle of Man
 21st LAA Regiment, RA – at Liverpool
 25th LAA Regiment, RA – at Liverpool
 33rd LAA Regiment, RA – at Liverpool
 53rd AA Brigade Company, RASC
 54th Anti-Aircraft Brigade – forming at Sutton Coldfield
 41st (5th North Staffordshire Regiment) AA Battalion, RE – infantry battalion at Stoke-on-Trent converted to searchlights in 1936
 45th (The Royal Warwickshire Regiment) AA Battalion, RE – infantry battalion at Birmingham converted to searchlights in 1936
 59th (Warwickshire) Searchlight Regiment, RA – new unit formed from a battery of the 45th AA Bn in 1938
 61st (South Lancashire Regiment) Searchlight Regiment, RA – infantry battalion at St Helens converted to searchlights in 1938
 54th AA Brigade Company, RASC
 4th AA Divisional Signals, Royal Corps of Signals – formed at liverpool, later at Chester, from a cadre provided by the 55th (West Lancashire) Divisional Signals
 4th AA Divisional Royal Army Service Corps – at Chester
 182nd and 913th Companies
 4th AA Divisional Company, Royal Army Medical Corps – at Manchester
 4th AA Divisional Workshop, Royal Army Ordnance Corps – RAOC Workshop companies became part of the new Royal Electrical and Mechanical Engineers (REME) during 1942

Deployment
At this point the division had a strength of 92 HAA guns (3-inch, 3.7-inch and 4.5-inch) while in the LAA role there were 26 3-inch, 13 2-pounder 'pom-pom' and 40 mm Bofors guns, and 469 light machine guns (LMGs), together with 244 searchlights. The HAA guns were deployed in the defended areas as follows:

 Liverpool	– 19 (plus 3 out of action)
 Manchester	– 12 (plus 10 out of action)
 Birmingham	– 20 (plus 4 out of action)
 Coventry	–12
 Cardiff	– 6 (plus 2 out of action)
 Newport	– 4

Phoney War
During the period of the Phoney War, the AA defences of NW England were not tested in action, and the time was spent in equipping and training the TA units. AA Command also had to provide equipment and units to the British Expeditionary Force assembling in France. From the 4th AA Division, the 73rd AA Regiment went to France in November 1939 where it joined the 12th Anti-Aircraft Brigade providing AA cover for the airfields of the RAF's Advanced Air Striking Force. In January 1940, Maj-Gen Martin went to command the AA defences of the BEF. He was replaced by Maj-Gen Charles Cadell, recently returned from commanding the AA defences of Malaya.

Battle of Britain
In the summer of 1940, all AA units equipped with 3-inch or heavier guns were designated as Heavy AA (HAA) regiments to distinguish them from the newer LAA units. Also, in August the AA battalions were transferred from the RE to the RA, which designated them searchlight regiments.

Deployment
At the start of the Battle of Britain, in July 1940, the 4th AA Division's guns were deployed as follows:
 Liverpool	– 52
 Manchester – 20
 Crewe	– 8
 Birmingham	– 64
 Coventry	– 44 
 RAF Ringway – 4
 Vital Points – 52 (mainly LAA)

Reorganisation
In September 1940, the 4th AA Division formed the 4th AA Z Regiment to command the new short-range rocket weapons known as Z Batteries. Also in September 1940, RAF Fighter Command created a new HQ (No. 9 Group RAF) to cover NW England, and henceforth the 4th AA Division cooperated with it.

As the Battle of Britain fought over southern England in the summer of 1940 developed into the night bombing of the Blitz in the autumn, AA Command continued to expand. In November a new division was formed by splitting the 34th and 54th AA Brigades off from the 4th AA Division to create the 11th AA Division, which took over responsibility for the West Midlands, while the 9th AA Division took over South Wales. At the same time, the 4th AA Division came under the control of a newly formed II AA Corps.

The Blitz

 The cities of NW England were heavily bombed during the winter of 1940–41 (the Liverpool Blitz and Manchester Blitz) and 'the actions fought [by the AA batteries] were as violent, dangerous and prolonged as any in the field'. 'On an HAA 4.5-inch position of 44th AA Brigade in Manchester, the power rammer on one gun failed. One Gunner loaded 127 of the 86-lb [40 kg] rounds himself in eleven hours of action, despite injuries to his fingers'.

The wide Mersey Estuary left a gap in the Liverpool defences that could not be fully covered by AA guns, and by mid-1941 AA Command had begun constructing three Maunsell Forts in the estuary on which to mount AA guns.

Order of Battle
During the winter of 1940–41, the division was composed as follows:

 33rd AA Brigade – Liverpool
 103th HAA Regiment, RA – formed May 1940
 106th HAA Regiment, RA – formed August 1940
 33rd LAA Regiment, RA – as above
 42nd LAA Regiment, RA – formed November 1939
 65th LAA Regiment, RA (part) – formed November 1940

 44th AA Brigade – Manchester
 98th HAA Regiment, RA – formed 1939
 115th HAA Regiment, RA – formed November 1940
 54th (Argyll & Sutherland Highlanders) LAA Regiment, RA – formed 1938 by conversion of 9th (Dumbartonshire) Bn, Argyll and Sutherland Highlanders
 76th LAA Regiment, RA – formed February 1941
 53rd AA Brigade – North Midlands
 39th (Lancashire Fusiliers) S/L Regiment, RA – as above
 62nd (The Loyals) S/L Regiment, RA – as above
 71st (East Lancashire) S/L Regiment, RA – as above
 92nd S/L Regiment, RA – formed May 1941
 4th AA Z Regiment, RA – as above
 13th AA Z Regiment, RA – formed August 1941The night raids continued into the following Spring, during which period Liverpool and its docks along the Mersey became the most heavily bombed area of Britain outside London, with particularly heavy attacks in December 1940 (the Christmas Blitz); in April 1941; and again the following month (the May Blitz).

Mid-War
The main Blitz ended in May 1941, but occasional raids continued on Manchester and Liverpool. Newly formed AA units joined the division, the HAA units increasingly being 'mixed' ones into which women of the Auxiliary Territorial Service were integrated. At the same time, experienced units were posted away for service overseas. This led to a continual turnover of units, which accelerated in 1942 with the preparations for Operation Torch and the need to transfer AA units from North West England to counter the Baedeker Blitz and the Luftwaffes hit-and-run attacks against South Coast towns.

Order of Battle 1941–42
During this period the division was composed as follows:

 33rd AA Brigade
 1st HAA Rgt – Regular regiment, transferred from 1st AA Brigade at Crewe; to Northern Ireland July 1941
 93rd HAA Rgt – as above; to the 44th AA Brigade July 1942
 95th HAA Rgt – joined September 1942
 103rd HAA Rgt – as above; left for mobile training May 1942
 107th HAA Rgt – new unit formed Autumn 1940, partly from the 103rd HAA Rgt; left April 1942
 117th HAA Rgt – joined autumn, to the 70th AA Brigade December 1941, returned May, left August 1942
 137th (Mixed) HAA Rgt – new unit formed November, joined December 1941, left September 1942
 149th (Mixed) HAA Rgt – new unit formed February, joined April 1942
 154th (Mixed) HAA Rgt – new unit formed March, joined May 1942
 29th LAA Rgt – joined autumn 1941, left February 1942
 33rd LAA Rgt – as above; left autumn 1941
 63rd LAA Rgt – from the 70th AA Brigade August  1942
 98th LAA Rgt – new unit formed December 1941, joined February, left May 1942
 134th LAA Rgt – new unit formed February, joined June, left August 1942
 4th AA 'Z' Rgt – as above; to the 70th AA Brigade summer, rejoined autumn 1941, left August 1942
 44 AA Brigade
 58th (Kent) HAA Rgt – joined February, left to join First Army for Operation Torch May 1942
 70th HAA Rgt – as above; left for India February 1942
 81st HAA Rgt – as above; rejoined from Orkney and Shetland Defences (OSDEF), June 1941; to the 70th AA Brigade summer 1941 93rd HAA Rgt – as above; from the 30th AA Brigade July, left for Middle East August 1942
 98th HAA Rgt – as above; left May 1942
 115th HAA Rgt – as above; to OSDEF June 1941
 151st (Mixed) HAA Rgt – new unit formed February, joined May, left July 1942
 21st LAA Rgt – as above; left autumn 1941
 39th LAA Rgt – joined summer; to the 53rd AA Brigade autumn; rejoined December 1941; to the 53rd AA Brigade July 1942
 65th LAA Rgt – as above; left summer 1941
 76th LAA Rgt – as above: to the 70th AA Brigade summer 1941
 80th LAA Rgt – joined autumn 1941
 88th LAA Rgt – joined May 1942
 13th AA 'Z' Rgt – joined autumn 1941
 53rd AA Brigade 39th LAA Rgt – as above; from the 44th AA Brigade autumn 1941 and again July 1942; left August 1942
 39th S/L Rgt – as above; rejoined from OSDEF May 1941
 62nd S/L Rgt  – as above
 71st S/L Rgt  – as above; to OSDEF May 1941, returned January 1941
 87th S/L Rgt –  new unit formed January 1941; left May 1942
 92 S/L Rgt – as above; to the 70th AA Brigade summer 1941
 70th AA Brigade''' – new formation created June 1941 62nd (Northumbrian) HAA Rgt – joined April, left for Operation Torch July 1942Routledge, p. 182.
 81st HAA Rgt – as above; left for Middle East April 1942 117th HAA Rgt – as above; from the 33rd AA Brigade December 1941, returned May 1942 131st HAA Rgt – joined August 1942 63rd LAA Rgt – joined July, to the 33rd AA Brigade August  1942 76th LAA Rgt – as above; left for Ceylon February 1942Joslen, p. 525.
 114th LAA Rgt – converted from the 91st S/L Rgt January 1942; left for mobile training June 1942 92nd S/L Rgt – as above 4th AA 'Z' Rgt – as above; from the 33nd AA Brigade summer, returned autumn 1941The increased sophistication of Operations Rooms and communications was reflected in the growth in signal units, which attained the following organisation by May 1942:
 4th AA Division Mixed Signal Unit HQ, RCS
 HQ No 1 Company
 4th AA Division Mixed Signal Office Section
 321st AA Gun Operations Room Mixed Signal Section
 323rd AA Gun Operations Room Mixed Signal Section
 325th AA Gun Operations Room Mixed Signal Section
 70th AA Brigade Signal Office Mixed Sub-Section
 10th AA Line Maintenance Section
 HQ No 2 Company
 406th AA Gun Operations Room Mixed Signal Section
 18th AA Sub-Gun Operations Room Mixed Signal Sub-Section
 19th AA Sub-Gun Operations Room Mixed Signal Sub-Section
 20th AA Sub-Gun Operations Room Mixed Signal Sub-Section
 21st AA Sub-Gun Operations Room Mixed Signal Sub-Section
 33rd AA Brigade Signal Office Mixed Sub-Section
 330th AA Gun Operations Room Mixed Signal Section
 44th AA Brigade Signal Office Mixed Sub-Section
 53rd AA Brigade Signal Office Mixed Sub-Section
 117th RAF Fighter Sector Sub-Section
 11th AA Line Maintenance Section
 12th AA Line Maintenance Section
 34th AA Sub-Gun Operations Room Mixed Signal Sub-Section
 4th AA Div Radio Maintenance Company, RAOC (later REME)

Disbandment
At the end of September 1942, AA Command disbanded the AA Corps and Divisions and replaced them with new AA Groups, whose areas of responsibility coincided with the Groups of RAF Fighter Command. The responsibilities of 4th AA Division (by then headquartered in Liverpool) were taken over by the 4th AA Group, with its HQ at Preston, which covered NW England and N Wales and operated with No. 9 Group RAF. 4th AA Divisional Signals became 4th AA Group Signals on 21 October 1942 The 4th AA Group in turn was disbanded in November 1944.

General Officer Commanding
The following officers commanded the 4th AA Division:
 Major-General Hugh Martin (1 September 1939 – 9 January 1940)
 Major-General Robert Pargiter (10 January–27 May 1940)
 Major-General Charles Cadell (28 May–13 February 1942)
 Major-General Osmund Frith (14 February–30 September 1942)

Notes

References

 Major L. F. Ellis, History of the Second World War, United Kingdom Military Series: The War in France and Flanders 1939–1940, London: HM Stationery Office, 1954
 General Sir Martin Farndale, History of the Royal Regiment of Artillery: The Years of Defeat: Europe and North Africa, 1939–1941, Woolwich: Royal Artillery Institution, 1988/London: Brasseys, 1996, .
 J.B.M. Frederick, Lineage Book of British Land Forces 1660–1978, Vol II, Wakefield, Microform Academic, 1984, .
 
 Norman E.H. Litchfield, The Territorial Artillery 1908–1988 (Their Lineage, Uniforms and Badges), Nottingham: Sherwood Press, 1992, .
 Cliff Lord & Graham Watson, Royal Corps of Signals: Unit Histories of the Corps (1920–2001) and its Antecedents, Solihull: Helion, 2003, .
 Maj-Gen R.F.H. Nalder, The Royal Corps of Signals: A History of its Antecedents and Developments (Circa 1800–1955), London: Royal Signals Institution, 1958.
 Brig N.W. Routledge, History of the Royal Regiment of Artillery: Anti-Aircraft Artillery 1914–55'', London: Royal Artillery Institution/Brassey's, 1994, .

External links
 British Generals of WWII at Generals.dk.
 Anti-Aircraft Command (1939) at British Military History
 Orders of Battle at Patriot Files
 The Royal Artillery 1939–45

Military units and formations established in 1939
4
Military units and formations disestablished in 1942
4
Military units and formations of the British Empire in World War II